Millionær for en aften (Millionaire for an Evening) is a Norwegian comedy film from 1960 directed by Øyvind Vennerød. It stars Henki Kolstad, Unni Bernhoft, and Willie Hoel. Jørn Ording and Vennerød arranged the screenplay, which was written by Bent Christensen and Werner Hedmann.

Plot
A shipowner is appointed to save a theater that is making a loss. A female ballet dancer thinks the shipowner is a journalist, and she asks him to play a shipowner to trick the theater director into putting on a play with her as the prima donna.

Cast

Henki Kolstad as the shipowner
Unni Bernhoft as Maj Grønlien Granner, the prima donna
Willie Hoel as the director of the Phoenix Theater
Harald Aimarsen
Arne Bang-Hansen as Rasmus Christian Frederik Bloch, the theater's commercial director
Jon Berle as a dancer
Kari Bjønnes as a dancer
Reidar Bøe
Lalla Carlsen as Maison Stella's proprietor
Karin Dahl as a dancer
Rolf Daleng as a dancer
Andreas Diesen
Kari Diesen
Johannes Eckhoff
Leif Enger
Egil Hjorth-Jenssen
Sverre Holm
Joachim Holst-Jensen
Topsy Irgens-Olsen as a dancer
Anne-Lise Karstensen as a dancer
Helge Krüger as a dancer
Lothar Lindtner
Gerd Mundal as a dancer
Mette Møller as a dancer
Grethe Nilsen as a dancer
Arvid Nilssen as Wang-Knutsen, a review author
Lillebil Kjellén
Arve Opsahl as Knut Møller
Sissel Ramberg as a dancer
Egil Åsman as a dancer
Rolf Sand
Ingebjørg Sem
Mette Marit Sem-Andersen as a dancer
Jo Stang as a dancer
Nanna Stenersen as Mrs. Hammer, a boarding house operator
Hanne Thorstensen as a dancer
Ulf Wengård
Carsten Winger

References

External links 
 
 Millionær for en aften at the National Library of Norway
 Millionær for en aften at Filmfront

1960 films
1960s Norwegian-language films
Norwegian comedy films
Films directed by Øyvind Vennerød
1960 comedy films